"All Mine" is a song recorded by South Korean girl group f(x) for the first season of SM Station, a weekly digital music project by their label SM Entertainment. The song was released through the project on July 22, 2016, serving as the group's first release since their Christmas single "Wish List" in December 2015, and subsequently their last Korean single to date as a quartet.

Background and release 
On July 20, 2016, it was announced that f(x) would be the next artist to release a single for the SM Station project, with the title, "All Mine", on July 22. The single was released digitally at midnight on July 22, 2016, by S.M. Entertainment, accompanied by a music video.

Music video 
The music video was filmed during f(x)'s stay in Japan for SM Town Live World Tour V in Osaka. It was directed and edited by the group's rapper, Amber.

Track listing

Charts

References 

2016 singles
2016 songs
Korean-language songs
F(x) (group) songs
SM Entertainment singles
Songs written by Andre Merritt
Songs written by Greg Bonnick
Songs written by Hayden Chapman